The 1999–2000 Dallas Stars season was the Stars' seventh season. The Stars were the defending Stanley Cup champions and once again advanced to the finals. However, this time they lost to the New Jersey Devils.

Offseason

Regular season

The Stars allowed the fewest power-play goals during the regular season, with 33, and had the best penalty-kill percentage, at 89.25%.

Final standings

Schedule and results

Player statistics

Regular season
Scoring

Goaltending

Playoffs
Scoring

Goaltending

Playoffs

Round 1

Dallas wins series 4-1

Round 2

Dallas wins series 4-1

Round 3

Dallas wins series 4-3

Stanley Cup Finals

New Jersey wins series 4-2 and the Stanley Cup

Awards and records
 Clarence S. Campbell Bowl
 Ed Belfour, Roger Crozier Saving Grace Award

Draft picks
Dallas's draft picks at the 1999 NHL Entry Draft held at the FleetCenter in Boston, Massachusetts.

References
 Stars on Hockey Database

Dall
Dall
Dallas Stars seasons
Western Conference (NHL) championship seasons
2